The fourth season of the American television drama series Breaking Bad premiered on July 17, 2011 and concluded on October 9, 2011. It consists of 13 episodes, each running approximately 47 minutes in length. AMC broadcast the fourth season on Sundays at 10:00 pm ET in the United States. The complete fourth season was released on Region 1 DVD and Region A Blu-ray on June 5, 2012.

Cast

Main
Bryan Cranston as Walter White
Anna Gunn as Skyler White
Aaron Paul as Jesse Pinkman
Dean Norris as Hank Schrader
Betsy Brandt as Marie Schrader
RJ Mitte as Walter White, Jr.
Bob Odenkirk as Saul Goodman
Giancarlo Esposito as Gustavo "Gus" Fring
Jonathan Banks as Mike Ehrmantraut

Recurring

Episodes

Production
On June 14, 2010, AMC announced that Breaking Bad was renewed for a fourth, 13-episode season. The writers began brainstorming and writing for the season in early July 2010. At the 2011 Television Critics Association press tour, it was announced production on the season would begin January 13, 2011. Filming ended in mid-June of that year. Although the writing staff knew the fourth season would focus primarily on the ongoing feud between Walter White and Gus Fring, they did not specifically plan out the entire season before production began, but rather developed the story as the episodes progressed. This followed a pattern similar to that of the third season and differed distinctly from the second season, where the entire storyline of the season was planned out in advance. Gilligan compared the fourth season to a "13-episode chess game" between Gus and Walt.

Originally, mini episodes of four minutes in length were to be produced before the premiere of the fourth season, but these did not come to fruition.  Actor Bryan Cranston commented that the season would debut in July 2011 in an interview with New York Magazine, he also said, regarding the premiere date, that "It was a decision from AMC that they wanted to position us in July... They want to attract as many eyeballs as possible, away from the heavy competition of the September, November [or] January start."

Reception

Reviews
The fourth season of Breaking Bad received universal acclaim from critics, garnering a 96 out of 100 on Metacritic. On review aggregator Rotten Tomatoes, the fourth season has an approval rating of 100% based on 34 reviews, with an average rating of 9.56/10. The site's critics consensus reads: "Breaking Bads fourth season continues to evolve and subvert expectations, and it's never been more riveting to watch." The Boston Globe referred to the show as a "taut exercise in withheld disaster" and declared the show "riveting". The Pittsburgh Post-Gazette labelled the series "smart and thought provoking that elevates the artistic achievements of the medium". Season four was listed by many critics as one of the best seasons of television in 2011. Time listed Walter White's "I am the one who knocks" line as one of the best television lines of 2011. The Pittsburgh Post-Gazette listed it as the best series of 2011 while noting that, "Breaking Bad is that rare TV series that has never made a seriously damaging storytelling misstep." The A.V. Club'''s review of the finale summed it up as a "fantastically fitting end for a season that ran in slow motion, starting and continuing with so many crises begging for resolution week after week. Now the decks are cleared, but that doesn't mean anybody is home free. Nothing's ever easy on Breaking Bad''." The reviewer continued to exalt the season, and proclaimed, "What a season of television — truly something none of us could ever have expected, or claimed we deserved." Best-selling author Noah Charney called it "the best show on television" and compared it to great works of literature for its three-dimensional characters and combination of action, drama, and dark comedy.

Awards and nominations

The fourth season received numerous awards and nominations, including 13 Primetime Emmy Award nominations. Aaron Paul won the only award for the series, winning for Outstanding Supporting Actor in a Drama Series. Its nominations included Outstanding Drama Series, Bryan Cranston for Outstanding Lead Actor in a Drama Series, Giancarlo Esposito for Outstanding Supporting Actor in a Drama Series, Anna Gunn for Outstanding Supporting Actress in a Drama Series, Mark Margolis for Outstanding Guest Actor in a Drama Series, Vince Gilligan for Outstanding Directing for a Drama Series ("Face Off"), Michael Slovis for Outstanding Cinematography for a One Hour Series ("Face Off"), and Kelley Dixon and Skip Macdonald each for Outstanding Single-Camera Picture Editing for a Drama Series ("End Times" and "Face Off"). "Face Off" was also nominated for Outstanding Sound Editing, Outstanding Sound Mixing, and Outstanding Special Visual Effects in a Supporting Role.

Bryan Cranston received his second consecutive Golden Globe Award nomination for Best Actor in a Drama Series. Cranston was also nominated for Outstanding Performance by a Male Actor in a Drama Series for the Screen Actors Guild Award, with the series nominated for Outstanding Performance by an Ensemble in a Drama Series.

Vince Gilligan received his first nomination for a Directors Guild of America Award for Outstanding Directing – Drama Series for "Face Off". The series earned three nominations for the Writers Guild of America Awards, winning two; Best Drama Series and Best Episodic Drama ("Box Cutter").

At the 28th TCA Awards, the series was nominated for three awards, including  Program of the Year, Outstanding Achievement in Drama, and Individual Achievement in Drama (Cranston). It went on to win Outstanding Achievement in Drama.

For the 2nd Critics' Choice Television Awards, the series received five nominations for Best Drama Series, Best Actor in a Drama Series (Cranston), Best Supporting Actor in a Drama Series (Giancarlo Esposito and Aaron Paul), and Best Supporting Actress in a Drama Series (Anna Gunn), winning two; Best Actor in a Drama Series (Cranston) and Best Supporting Actor in a Drama Series (Esposito).

The series also received two Satellite Award nominations for Best Drama Series and Best Actor in a Drama Series (Cranston), along with six Saturn Award nominations, including Best Syndicated/Cable Television Series, Best Actor on Television (Cranston), Best Supporting Actor on Television (Esposito and Paul), and Best Guest Performer on Television (Steven Bauer and Mark Margolis), winning three; Best Syndicated/Cable Television Series, Best Actor on Television (Cranston), and Best Supporting Actor on Television (Paul).

Kelley Dixon and Skip Macdonald were each nominated for an Eddie Award for Best Edited One-Hour Series for Commercial Television. Dixon was nominated for "End Times" and MacDonald was nominated for "Face Off". MacDonald went on to win the award.

References

Further reading

External links
 

 
2011 American television seasons
4
Television series set in 2009